Marlie the Killer is a 1928 American silent action film directed by Noel M. Smith and starring Francis X. Bushman Jr., Joseph W. Girard and Blanche Mehaffey. It was designed as a vehicle for Klondike the Dog, an imitator of Rin Tin Tin.

Cast
 Klondike the Dog as Klondike 
 Francis X. Bushman Jr. as Bob Cleveland 
 Joseph W. Girard as John Cleveland 
 Blanche Mehaffey as Marion Nichols 
 Richard Alexander as Sam McKee 
 Sheldon Lewis as Tom Arnold

References

Bibliography
 Munden, Kenneth White. The American Film Institute Catalog of Motion Pictures Produced in the United States, Part 1. University of California Press, 1997.

External links
 

1928 films
1920s action films
American silent feature films
American action films
Films directed by Noel M. Smith
American black-and-white films
Pathé Exchange films
1920s English-language films
1920s American films